Van Sung's shrew (Chodsigoa caovansunga), also known as Cao Van Sung mountain shrew is a species of shrew in the Soricomorpha order. Specimens of Chodsigoa caovansunga have been found in Vietnam.

Chodsigoa caovansunga was named after Cao Van Sung, a small-mammal specialist at the Institute of Ecology and Biological Resources in Hanoi. The type locality is situated at 1500 m altitude (22° 45'27 "N 104° 49'49" W) on Mount Tay Con Linh II in the town of Cao Bo, district Vi Xuyen, in the province of Ha Giang. C. caovansunga a small species with a relatively short tail without brush of long hair on its end. The hands and feet are brownish in color.

References

Red-toothed shrews
Mammals described in 2003